Marie-Ève Beauchemin-Nadeau (born October 13, 1988) is a Canadian Olympian weightlifter. She competed at the 2012 Summer Olympics in the -69 kg event and finished eighth. At the 2014 Commonwealth Games she won a gold medal in the 75 kg event with a 110 kg snatch and a 140 clean and jerk for a combined total of 250 kg, a Commonwealth Games record.  She competed at the 2016 Summer Olympics in the same category, again finishing eighth, with a total of 228 kg.

References 

1988 births
Living people
Olympic weightlifters of Canada
Weightlifters at the 2012 Summer Olympics
People from Montérégie
Sportspeople from Montreal
Commonwealth Games gold medallists for Canada
Commonwealth Games silver medallists for Canada
Weightlifters at the 2010 Commonwealth Games
Weightlifters at the 2014 Commonwealth Games
Canadian female weightlifters
Weightlifters at the 2016 Summer Olympics
Commonwealth Games medallists in weightlifting
Universiade medalists in weightlifting
Weightlifters at the 2018 Commonwealth Games
Weightlifters at the 2015 Pan American Games
Universiade bronze medalists for Canada
Medalists at the 2011 Summer Universiade
Medalists at the 2013 Summer Universiade
Pan American Games competitors for Canada
21st-century Canadian women
Medallists at the 2010 Commonwealth Games
Medallists at the 2014 Commonwealth Games
Medallists at the 2018 Commonwealth Games